Canthocamptus is a genus of copepods (small crustaceans) that live in freshwater of Holarctic. There are 21 different species  of Canthocamptus.

Species 

 Canthocamptus assimilis Kiefer, 1931
 Canthocamptus baikalensis Borutsky, 1930
 Canthocamptus bulbifer Borutsky, 1952
 Canthocamptus carinatus Shen & Sung, 1973
 Canthocamptus glacialis Lilljeborg, 1902
 Canthocamptus iaponicus Brehm, 1927
 Canthocamptus kitaurensis Kikuchi in Ishida & Kikuchi, 1999
 Canthocamptus kunzi Apostolov, 1969
 Canthocamptus latus Borutsky, 1947
 Canthocamptus longifurcatus Borutsky, 1947
 Canthocamptus macrosetifer Ishida in Ishida & Kikuchi, 1999
 Canthocamptus microstaphylinus Wolf in Lauterborn & Wolf, 1909
 Canthocamptus oregonensis M. S. Wilson, 1956
 Canthocamptus robertcokeri M. S. Wilson, 1958
 Canthocamptus sinuus Coker, 1934
 Canthocamptus staphylinoides Pearse, 1905
 Canthocamptus staphylinus (Jurine, 1820)
 Canthocamptus takkobuensis Ishida in Ishida & Kikuchi, 1999
 Canthocamptus vagus Coker & Morgan, 1940
 Canthocamptus verestschagini (Borutsky, 1931)
 Canthocamptus waldemarschneideri Novikov & Sharafutdinova, 2022

References

External links 
  Photos of Canthocamptus assimilis

Harpacticoida